Eren Albayrak (born 23 April 1991) is a Turkish professional footballer who plays as a left back for TFF First League club Bodrumspor. He has represented Turkey at all youth levels and currently has 92 youth caps.

Honours 
Bursaspor
Süper Lig: 2009–10

References

External links

 
 

1991 births
Living people
People from Üsküdar
Footballers from Istanbul
Turkish footballers
Turkey B international footballers
Turkey under-21 international footballers
Turkey youth international footballers
Trabzonspor footballers
Bursaspor footballers
Orduspor footballers
1461 Trabzon footballers
Çaykur Rizespor footballers
İstanbul Başakşehir F.K. players
Konyaspor footballers
Júbilo Iwata players
Antalyaspor footballers
Süper Lig players
J1 League players
TFF First League players
Association football midfielders
Turkey international footballers
Turkish expatriate footballers
Expatriate footballers in Japan
Turkish expatriate sportspeople in Japan